Bistre (or bister) can refer to two things: a very dark shade of grayish brown (the version shown on the immediate right); a shade of brown made from soot, or the name for a color resembling the brownish pigment. Bistre's appearance is generally of a dark grayish brown, with a yellowish cast.

Beechwood was burned to produce the soot, which was boiled and diluted with water. Many Old Masters used bistre as the ink for their drawings.

The first recorded use of bistre as a color name in English was in 1727; another name for the color bistre is  soot brown.



Variations of bistre

Bistre brown

At right is displayed the color bistre brown, a medium brownish tone of the color bistre, also known as soot brown.

This is the tone of bistre that most closely matches the color sample in the 1930 book A Dictionary of Color by Maerz and Paul.

This tone of bistre is the color of the ink that was used by the Old Masters for their drawings.

The normalized color coordinates for bistre brown are identical to the color names drab, sand dune, and mode beige, which were first recorded as color names in English, respectively, in 1686, 1925, and 1928.

French bistre

At right is displayed the color French bistre, which is the tone of bistre called bistre in the Pourpre.com color list, a color list widely popular in France.

For pictures of bistre colored postage stamps, see the article on the color Bistre in the French Wikipedia.

Spanish bistre

Spanish bistre is the color that is called bistre (the Spanish word for "bistre" is the same as the English word) in the Guía de coloraciones (Guide to colorations) by Rosa Gallego and Juan Carlos Sanz, a color dictionary published in 2005 that is widely popular in the Hispanophone realm.

Drawing made with the pigment bistre

See also 
 List of colors
 Trois crayons

References

Pigments
Organic pigments
Shades of brown
Shades of gray